Seafood City is a Filipino supermarket chain founded in National City, California as Manila Seafood and headquartered in Pomona, California, with American locations in California, Hawaii, Illinois, Nevada, and Washington and Canadian locations in Ontario, Alberta, and Manitoba. 

Seafood City Supermarket specializes in Filipino food and products and offers a wide selection of imported Asian goods as well as American staples. As its name suggests, Seafood City provides fresh seafood, as well as meat and produce.  In some of its locations, it acts as a marketplace and serves as an anchor to Filipino businesses such as Chowking, Red Ribbon, Jollibee, and Tokyo Tokyo. In other locations, Seafood City also features locally owned Filipino video rental stores, immigration offices, travel agencies, and restaurants.

Seafood City opened its first store in National City, California in 1989. It has since expanded to 21 stores in California, with a concentration in the Greater Los Angeles Area, San Diego County, and Northern California. Further expansion has led the company to open markets in the Las Vegas, Nevada area, Seattle (Tukwila, Washington), Chicago, Illinois, and Waipahu, Hawaii.

Canadian stores and expansion plans

Seafood City has expanded into Canada by opening its first location in Mississauga, Ontario in the Heartland Town Centre shopping district in the fall of 2017. Additional stores followed in Winnipeg in 2019, Edmonton and Calgary in 2020, and Scarborough, Ontario in 2021.

See also 
 Little Manila
 Asian supermarket

References

External links 
 Seafood City homepage

Asian-American culture in Nevada
Asian-American culture in Washington (state)
Filipino-American culture in California
Filipino-American culture in Hawaii
Retail companies established in 1989
Companies based in Los Angeles
Supermarkets of the United States